Glen Cove's Gurdwara Mata Sahib Kaur is a Sikh Gurdwara or temple in Glen Cove, New York in Nassau County on Long Island. It has an area of 15 acres near Long Island Sound.

The main building is  built-up area, 20 rooms and three halls. There is a secondary building with a five-bedroom house as the residence of sewadars. The property was purchased for $1.20 million to make a gurdwara. This gurdwara was founded by the Sikhs of Long Island, New York when they felt that they needed a larger facility. It separated from Gurdwara Guru Gobind Singh Sikh Center Plainview.

The first head priest was Singh Sahib Gyani Jagtar Singh Jachak. Bhai Sahib left to serve again as an international Kathakaar. Presently the granthi is Bhai Paramjit Singh. Sewadars of Gurdwara Sahib are Bhai Swinder Singh and Bhai Navdeep Singh. The president of Gurdwara Sahib is Sardar Harbinder Singh Sachdev and secretary is Sardar Mohan Singh Kabuli.

Gurdwara Sahib have Ragi Jathas by each month and Gurbani Vichar is done by Sikh preachers.

Gurdwara Sahib attracts an average weekly congregation of 200 families from the surrounding area.
 
It has weekly services and celebrates Gurpurabs:

 Informal Diwan on Fridays from 7 to 8:30pm
 Formal weekly services on Sundays from 
 10 am with Sukhmani Sahib
 11-12:15 Asa Di Var
 12:15-12:45 Gurbani Katha 
 12:45-1 Kids Program
1-1:30 Shabad Kirtan
Finished with Guru Ka Langar.

Associations/organizations associated with Gurdwara Sahib are East Punjab Sikh Society, Itshi Ladies Satsang, Sikh Missionary College, International Sikh Women's Council, American Sikh Prabhandak Committee, World Sikh Council, Akhand Keertani Jatha, The Sikh Coalition, Long Island Keertan Project.

Gurdwaras in the United States
Sikh places
Glen Cove, New York
Sikhism in New York (state)
Buildings and structures in Nassau County, New York